All times are UK local time (UTC or UTC+1) on the relevant dates.

Regular season

Super 8s

Shield

References

RFL League 1
2017 in English rugby league
2017 in Welsh rugby league
2017 in Canadian rugby league